The 2015–16 Gamma Ethniki was the 33rd season since the official establishment of the third tier of Greek football in 1983.
It started on 27 September 2015 and ended on 8 May 2016.

64 teams were separated into four groups, according to geographical criteria.

Zakynthiakos and Paniliakos withdrew from the league before the group draw.

Group 1

Teams

Standings

Group 2

Teams

Standings

Group 3

Teams

Standings

Group 4

Teams

Standings

References

Third level Greek football league seasons
3
Greece